"Sunshine" is a song by American hard rock band Aerosmith, written by Steven Tyler, Joe Perry, and Marti Frederiksen. It was released in mid-2001 as a promotional single from the band's album Just Push Play.

Aerosmith had to cancel a gig in Irvine, California in order to complete the filming of the music video for this song.

The song's lyrics have an Alice in Wonderland feel with such lyrics as "I followed Alice into wonderland", "Took to the hatter like a walk in the park", "I ate the mushroom and I dance with the queen", "I chased that rabbit up her Bodhi Tree" and "That caterpillar's tryin' to cop a plea". Also included are the lyrics "She's finer than a painted rose", which possibly refer to Disney's cartoon adaptation when the Queen's men try to paint the white roses red.

The cover art was drawn by cartoonist Larry Welz.

"Sunshine" is also a street name for LSD. However, the lyrics "Sunshine, the kind that everybody knows" may suggest that the song does not refer to LSD. It was the last Aerosmith original single released in a band's studio record until 2012's single "Legendary Child", although the 2002's "Girls of Summer" and 2006's "Devil's Got a New Disguise" singles respectively, would be released on compilation albums.

Music video
The music video directed by Samuel Bayer, features several characters from the book, and Tyler portrays the Mad Hatter.

Track listing
Promo CD:
 "Sunshine (Radio Remix)" - 3:26

References

Aerosmith songs
2001 singles
Songs written by Marti Frederiksen
Songs written by Steven Tyler
Songs written by Joe Perry (musician)
Music based on Alice in Wonderland
Music videos directed by Samuel Bayer
Columbia Records singles
2001 songs